The Dark Stairway is a 1938 British crime film, directed by Arthur B. Woods and starring Hugh Williams, Chili Bouchier and Garry Marsh.

The film was a quota quickie production, based on the 1931 novel From This Dark Stairway by Mignon G. Eberhart. In the film, professional jealousy and rivalry erupts in a hospital over the discovery of a revolutionary new formula for anaesthetic, leading to murder.  The Dark Stairway is now classed as a lost film.

Cast
 Hugh Williams as Dr. Thurlow
 Chili Bouchier as Betty Trimmer
 Garry Marsh as Dr. Mortimer
 Reginald Purdell as Askew
 Lesley Brook as Mary Cresswell
 Aubrey Pollock as Dr. Cresswell
 Glen Alyn as Isabel Simmonds
 John Carol as Merridew
 Robert Rendel as Dr. Fletcher

References

External links 
 
 The Dark Stairway at BFI Film & TV Database

1938 films
1938 crime films
Films directed by Arthur B. Woods
Lost British films
British black-and-white films
Films based on American novels
British crime films
1938 lost films
1930s English-language films
1930s British films